Shi Jintong (born May 1979) is a Chinese politician of Miao ethnicity, currently serving as deputy townhead of Shuanglong Town and party secretary of Shibadong Village.

He is a representative of the 20th National Congress of the Chinese Communist Party and an alternate member of the 20th Central Committee of the Chinese Communist Party.

Biography
A native of the Shibadong Village of Shuanglong Town in Huayuan County, Hunan, Shi joined the Chinese Communist Party (CCP) in June 2001, and was proposed as director of his home-village in August 2005 and rose to become deputy townhead of his home-town in May 2017.

Shi is a supporter of Xi Jinping, general secretary of the CCP Central Committee, who inspected the village to propose the policy of "Targeted Poverty Alleviation" for the first time. Shibadong Village became a testing ground for the new initiative in since Xi's investigation.

References

1979 births
Living people
Miao people
People from Huayuan County
People's Republic of China politicians from Hunan
Chinese Communist Party politicians from Hunan
Alternate members of the 20th Central Committee of the Chinese Communist Party